Pakistan started banning films in 1962, with restrictions tightened in 1979 when Muhammad Zia ul-Haq implemented an Islamization agenda and an even stricter censorship code. A ban on Indian films and media (which had been in place since 1965 but was not always strictly enforced) was lifted in 2008, with the compromise that cinemas in Pakistan must equally share screening time between Indian and Pakistani films, but was later enforced again in late 2016.

2006

2010

2011

2012

2013

2014

2015

2016

2017

2018

2019-present 
Since February 2019, Pakistan has banned the screening of all Indian films amid border tensions between the countries.

References 

Film controversies in Pakistan
Banned
Pakistan
Banned